The R. William Jones Cup, also known as the Jones Cup, is an international basketball tournament organized by the Chinese Taipei Basketball Association (CTBA) held annually since 1977 in Taiwan.

It was named in honor of basketball promoter Renato William Jones, who was one of the founders of the International Basketball Federation (FIBA). Like the Olympics and the FIBA Basketball World Cup, it has both men's and women's versions. Despite lacking the prestige of the Olympic tournament and the FIBA World Championship, it is a tournament that draws global interest. Like the FIBA Stanovic Continental Champions Cup, the Renato Williams Jones Cup serves as a preparation for major tournaments, such as the Olympic Basketball Tournament, the FIBA World Cup, and the continental tournaments. Also, the Renato Williams Jones Cup serves and promotes basketball in the world. The men's version is currently being dominated by American teams since the tournament's inaugural staging while the women's version is being jointly dominated by South Korean, American and Taiwanese teams. It also invites professional club, collegiate and national teams from around the world, although the participants are mainly from the Asian, European, Egyptian and North American regions.

In both tournaments, each country can only be represented by one team, which could be its national team, youth team, club team, or an all-star selection, except for the hosts Taiwan, which could opt to have two teams.

Since the tournament is not sanctioned by FIBA, the Taiwanese national team which usually competes as "Chinese Taipei" is referred to as "Republic of China" by the organizers.

The tournament has not been held since 2019 due to the COVID-19 pandemic in Taiwan.

History
The tournament was conceived in 1977 as a tribute to Englishman Renato William Jones, who was FIBA secretary-general for 44 years and was instrumental in the granting of zone commission status for Asia at the 1964 FIBA World Congress in Tokyo. Jones also attended the Asian Basketball Championships in 1963, which was held in Taipei.

The invitational tournament organized by the Chinese Taipei Basketball Association was made following the admission of the People's Republic of China as a regular member of the ABC in 1975.

The William Jones Cup was cancelled thrice; in 1989 when the main venue was affected by fire, in 2003 due to the SARS outbreak, and in 2020 due to the COVID-19 pandemic.

Champions

Men's tournament

Summaries

Medal table

Women's tournament

Summaries

Medal table

See also 
 List of sporting events in Taiwan

Notes

References

 
Basketball competitions in Asia between national teams
International basketball competitions hosted by Taiwan
Recurring sporting events established in 1975
1975 establishments in Taiwan